Javed Miandad is a former batsman and captain of Pakistan. He scored 23 centuries in Test cricket and  8 One Day International (ODI) hundreds during his 17-year international career. Miandad played 124 Test matches and notched 8,832 runs to remain the leading scorer for Pakistan in Test cricket. In 233 ODI matches, he scored 7,381 runs. In 1982, he was named as one of the Wisden Cricketers of the Year; the cricket almanac tagged him as "one of the best and most exciting players in the world". He was inducted into the ICC Cricket Hall of Fame in January 2009.

Miandad scored century on his Test debut against New Zealand at the Gaddafi Stadium, Lahore, in 1976. He was only the second Pakistan player to achieve this feat. In the third and final Test of the series at National Stadium, Karachi, he made 206 runs and, at 19 years and 141 days, became the youngest ever player to complete a double hundred. Seven years later, in 1983, Miandad realized his highest Test score, an unbeaten 280, against India at the Niaz Stadium, Hyderabad.

In Test cricket, Miandad made a double century on six occasions. He also scored a century in his 100th Test match and is only the second player to do so in the annals of the game. Miandad scored Test hundreds at thirteen  cricket grounds, including nine at venues outside Pakistan. Four of his Test centuries came while captaining his team. As of August 2012, he was twenty-first in the overall list of most hundreds in a Test career.

Having made his ODI debut in 1975 against the West Indies at Edgbaston, Birmingham, Miandad scored his first ODI century against India at Municipal Stadium, Gujranwala, in 1982. His highest ODI score of 119 not out came in a match which Pakistan lost to India at the Gaddafi Stadium, on 31 December 1982. As of August 2012, he was thirtieth overall among all-time combined century makers, a position he shares with Saeed Anwar and Aravinda de Silva.

Key

Test cricket centuries

One Day International centuries

Notes

References

External links 

Miandad
Miandad, Javed